Arthur Freeman may refer to:
 Arthur Freeman, pen name of Aaron Liebermann (1840–1880), Russian Jewish writer
 Arthur Freeman (cricketer) (1871–1948), English cricketer
 Arthur Phillip Freeman (born 1972), Australian man charged, tried and convicted of murdering his daughter
Arthur Freeman (jockey)(1926–1988), English jockey who won the 1958 Grand National